Jimmy Leonard Stolk (born 1942) is a Surinamese former soldier, entrepreneur, and suspect in the trial about the December murders. Stolk was active as a military in the Surinamese army during the government (military dictatorship) of Dési Bouterse, and is suspected of involvement in the December Murders of 1982. Stolk was head of the prison, and member of the military tribunal.

Stolk transported one of the victims of the December Murders, the soldier Jiwansingh Sheombar, from the Memre Boekoe barracks to Fort Zeelandia in his own car; according to Stolk by command of his superiors, and for interrogation. Sheombar was shot later, together with fourteen others.

On 29 November 2019 Stolk was acquitted.

References

Stolk is suspected in the December Murders trial according to NRC Handelsblad 
Stolk is suspected in the December Murders trial according to Suriname Portal 
Stolk mentioned as suspect in the December Murders trial in Dagblad Suriname 

December murders
Surinamese military personnel
20th-century Surinamese businesspeople
Surinamese people of Dutch descent
Living people
1942 births